The 55th Annual Country Music Association Awards were held on Wednesday, November 10, 2021 at the Bridgestone Arena in Nashville, Tennessee. The ceremony was hosted by CMA Award winner Luke Bryan.

Background
After a video clip surfaced in early 2021 showing an inebriated Morgan Wallen using a racial slur the Country Music Association announced on May 21, 2021, that Wallen's 2021 CMA Awards eligibility would be limited to, “categories that honor artistic works (Single, Song, Album, Musical Event, and Music Video of the Year categories), so as not to "limit opportunity for other credited collaborators," but the press release further states that Wallen would not be eligible in solo categories as Entertainer of the Year and Male Vocalist of the Year.

On October 1, 2021, the CMA announced that Wallen would not be allowed to attend the 2021 ceremony or any of the pre-show pageantry, despite being nominated in the Album of the Year category. Speaking to the Los Angeles Times, CMA CEO Sarah Trahern said she didn't believe anyone had ever been disqualified from the show due to conduct before. "Honoring him as an individual this year is not right, and he will not be allowed on the red carpet, on our stage, or be celebrated in any way," she says.

On October 18, 2021 it was announced by the CMA that Luke Bryan will host the ceremony for the first time. This is the first time the ceremony has had a solo host in 18 years, the last being Vince Gill.

The CMA announced that ticketed audience members would have to prove full vaccination status against COVID-19 and wear appropriate face coverings. Performers and presenters was not expected to follow the same requirements as the audience.

Winners and nominees
The eligibility period for nominees is July 1, 2020 to June 30, 2021. The nominees were announced on September 9, 2021.

Winners in Bold.

International Awards

Performers
The first wave of performers were announced on October 21, 2021, followed by the second and third waves on October 27 and November 4.

Presenters

Nominee Milestones
 Miranda Lambert is now the third most-nominated artist in CMA history with 58 nominations including 3 this ceremony; Lambert is behind Alan Jackson (81) and George Strait (83).
Mickey Guyton becomes the first black woman to be nominated for an individual award at the CMA awards.
Guyton is only the eighth black female artist ever to be nominated at the CMA awards, the previous nominees being The Pointer Sisters in for Vocal Group of the Year in 1975; Anita Pointer for Vocal Duo of the Year (with Earl Thomas Conley) in 1987; Natalie Cole, Gladys Knight, Patti LaBelle, The Pointer Sisters and The Staple Singers for Album of the Year in 1994 (Rhythm, Country and Blues); and Rhiannon Giddens for Musical Event of the Year (with Eric Church) in 2017 ("Kill a Word").
Carly Pearce winning Female Vocalist of the Year, she joins to 8 other female artists to win on their first nomination: the first being Loretta Lynn, the second being Olivia Newton-John, the third being K.T. Oslin, the fourth being Mary Chapin Carpenter, the fifth being Alison Krauss, the sixth being Trisha Yearwood, the seventh being Gretchen Wilson and the eighth being Carrie Underwood.
 Jimmie Allen became the second African-American artist to win New Artist of the Year, the first being Darius Rucker in 2009.

References

Country Music Association Awards
2021 awards in the United States
Country Music Association
CMA
Country Music Association Awards
November 2021 events in the United States
21st century in Nashville, Tennessee
Events in Nashville, Tennessee